The women's changquan competition at the 1998 Asian Games in Bangkok, Thailand, was held from December 16–18 at the Thammasat Gymnasium 6.

Schedule
All times are Indochina Time (UTC+07:00)

Results
Legend
DNF — Did not finish

References

External links
Official website

Wushu at the 1998 Asian Games